Patrick Nicol Troy  (22 January 1936 – 24 July 2018) was an Australian academic who served as Vale Professor Emeritus at Australian National University. He was born in Geraldton, Western Australia, the eldest son of Patrick Laurence Troy and Mabel Nielson, who had married in the previous year.

Troy was raised in Fremantle and trained as a civil engineer. Before joining academia, he was secretary of the Maritime Services Union in Perth and a founder of the Trades and Labour Council of Western Australia. He joined the faculty of Australian National University in 1965 and retired in 2011. Over the course of his career, Troy was named an Officer of the Order of Australia and granted fellowship by the Academy of Social Sciences in Australia. He became Deputy Secretary in the Federal Department of Urban and Regional Development in the Whitlam Government. He died in Canberra on 24 July 2018.

He held public appointments including Deputy Chairman of the Australian Housing Corporation 1984-1992, Member of the Australian Housing Council 1995, Member of the Board of Inquiry into the Administration of Leasehold in the Australian Capital Territory 2003-2006 and Member of the ACT Planning and Land Council.

Troy was made a Companion of the Order of Australia (AC) posthumously in the 2019 Australia Day Honours for "eminent service to urban and regional planning, to environmental sustainability and social justice policy, and as a mentor and role model".

Bibliography

References

1936 births
2018 deaths
Australian civil engineers
Australian urban planners
Academic staff of the Australian National University
Officers of the Order of Australia
Fellows of the Academy of the Social Sciences in Australia
People from Fremantle
Australian people of Irish descent
Companions of the Order of Australia